Good Timin': Live at Knebworth, England 1980 is the fourth live album and a concert film by American rock band the Beach Boys that was recorded at Knebworth, Hertfordshire on June 21, 1980. It is their only released concert performance that features Brian Wilson, Dennis Wilson, Carl Wilson, Mike Love, Al Jardine and Bruce Johnston together.

The concert, a shared bill with Mike Oldfield and Santana, was the band's last major UK performance together until their 2012 reunion tour. Good Timin was first issued in the UK in 2002 and the following year in the US, both through the band's Brother Records imprint with independent distribution.

Track listing
"Intro" – 0:49
"California Girls" (Brian Wilson, Mike Love) – 3:10
"Sloop John B" (Traditional; arranged by B. Wilson) – 3:04
"Darlin'" (B. Wilson, Love) – 2:37
"School Days" (Chuck Berry) – 3:26
"God Only Knows" (B. Wilson, Tony Asher) – 2:51
"Be True to Your School" (B. Wilson, Love) – 2:27
"Do It Again" (B. Wilson, Love) – 3:08
"Little Deuce Coupe" (B. Wilson, Roger Christian) – 2:14
"Cotton Fields"/"Heroes And Villains" (Huddie Ledbetter & B. Wilson, Van Dyke Parks) – 5:19
"Happy Birthday, Brian" (Mildred J. Hill and Patty Smith Hill) – 1:25
"Keepin' the Summer Alive" (Carl Wilson, Randy Bachman) – 3:42
"Lady Lynda" (Al Jardine, Ron Altbach) – 5:01
"Surfer Girl" (B. Wilson) – 2:39
"Help Me, Rhonda" (B. Wilson, Love) – 4:05
"Rock & Roll Music" (Berry) – 2:22
"I Get Around" (B. Wilson, Love) – 2:14
"Surfin' U.S.A." (B. Wilson, Chuck Berry) – 2:54
"You Are So Beautiful" (Bruce Fisher, Billy Preston) – 3:13
"Good Vibrations" (B. Wilson, Love) – 6:03
"Barbara Ann" (Fred Fassert) – 2:46
"Fun, Fun, Fun" (B. Wilson, Love) – 4:49

Certifications

References

2002 live albums
The Beach Boys live albums
Albums produced by Mark Linett
Eagle Records live albums
Films about the Beach Boys
Brother Records live albums
Live albums published posthumously